Archibald Currie (7 March 1888 – 28 November 1986) was Prime Minister and Governor of Suriname.

Currie started his career as a surveyor. Later he was appointed as Chief of Police in Paramaribo. Between 1950 and 1954, he was first Minister of Finances and later Minister of Economic and Social Affairs. Currie became Prime Minister of Suriname from 1952 to 1955 and Governor of Suriname from 1962 to 1964. Between 19 March 1962 until 3 March 1963 as an Acting Governor, and 23 March 1963 to 24 September 1964 as appointed Governor. He was the first governor born in Suriname and was a member of the National Party of Suriname. 

There is a statue of Currie made by Jozef Klas in front of the Presidential Palace.

References 

1888 births
1986 deaths
Governors of Suriname
National Party of Suriname politicians
People from Commewijne District
Prime Ministers of Suriname
Finance ministers of Suriname
Surinamese people of Scottish descent